Jamie Bartlett is a British author and journalist, primarily for The Spectator and The Daily Telegraph. He was a senior fellow at Demos and served as director of the Centre for the Analysis of Social Media at Demos until 2017.

Education
Bartlett was educated at a state comprehensive school in Chatham, Kent He won a scholarship to study at the University of Oxford and went on do a master's degree at the London School of Economics.

Career
In 2013, he covered the rise of Beppe Grillo's Five Star Movement in Italy for Demos, chronicling the new political force's emergence and use of social media.

In 2014, Bartlett released his first full-length book, The Dark Net. The book discusses the darknet and dark web in broad terms, describing a range of underground and emergent subcultures, including social media racists, camgirls, self-harm communities, darknet drug markets, crypto-anarchists and transhumanists.

Bartlett has frequently written about online extremism and free speech, as well as social media trends in Wikipedia, Twitter and Facebook.

In 2017, he published his second book Radicals Chasing Utopia, which covered fringe political movements including transhumanism, psychedelic societies and anarcho-capitalism. He also presented the two part BBC Two series The Secrets of Silicon Valley.

Bartlett's third book, The People Vs Tech, was released in 2018. It argued that "our fragile political system is being threatened by the digital revolution."

In 2019 he co-wrote and presented the BBC podcast series The Missing Cryptoqueen, which investigated the disappearance of Dr Ruja Ignatova, founder of the fake cryptocurrency OneCoin. The podcast also examines how OneCoin operates, and its human and social cost.

References 

Living people
English male journalists
English columnists
Dark web
English bloggers
The Daily Telegraph people
British male bloggers
Year of birth missing (living people)